China Gezhouba Group Company Limited is a Chinese construction and engineering company based in Wuhan, Hubei. As of 2014, the company is the 33rd largest contractor by revenue in the world. The major shareholder of the company (40.8%) is state-owned China Gezhouba Group Corporation (CGGC), which is in turn a subsidiary of the China Energy Engineering Corporation (Energy China).

Primarily engaged in contract construction of projects, Gezhouba operates in the areas of power plants, dams, roads, bridges and civil engineering in China and abroad. In other categories of business, Gezhouba has invested and constructed highways; developed real estate; generated hydropower; and manufactured cement and civil explosives.

The company has been very keen to expand overseas business with a stated goal of increasing international contracts to half of company revenue.  Underlying the confident growth projections is a track record of picking up overseas contracts in hydroelectric engineering, the kind of work that accounts for most of Gezhouba's international portfolio. Overseas projects include a 4.97 billion yuan ($727.78 million) contract signed in 2010 with Kazakhstan Natural Gas Technology to establish a hydroelectric plan on the banks of the Chilik River in Kazakhstan. In November 2014, the firm was also chosen to a construct a 40 km portion of the Hazara Motorway in Pakistan.

References

External links
Official website

Companies listed on the Shanghai Stock Exchange
Companies based in Wuhan
Construction and civil engineering companies of China
Chinese companies established in 2006
Construction and civil engineering companies established in 2006